Amateur geology or rock collecting (also referred to as rockhounding in the United States and Canada) is the non-professional study and hobby of collecting rocks and minerals or fossil specimens from the natural environment.  In Australia, New Zealand and Cornwall, the activities of amateur geologists are called fossicking.  The first amateur geologists were prospectors looking for valuable minerals and gemstones for commercial purposes.  Eventually, however, more people have been drawn to amateur geology for recreational purposes, mainly for the beauty that rocks and minerals provide.

Accessibility
One reason for the rise in popularity of amateur geology is that a collection can begin by simply picking up a rock.  There are also many clubs and groups that search for specimens and compare them in groups as a hobby.  Information on where to find such groups can be found at libraries, bookstores, and "gem and mineral shows". Tourist information centers and small-town chambers of commerce can also supply valuable local information. The Internet can also be a useful search tool as it can help find other amateur geologists.

Tools

The amateur geologist's principal piece of equipment is the geologist's hammer.  This is a small tool with a pick-like point on one end, and a flat hammer on the other.  The hammer end is for breaking rocks, and the pick end is mainly used for prying and digging into crevices.  The pick end of most rock hammers can dull quickly if struck onto bare rock. Rock collectors may also bring a sledgehammer to break hard rocks. Good places for a collector to look are quarries, road cuts, rocky hills and mountains, and streams.

Legality
There are many different laws in place regarding the collection of rocks and minerals from public areas, so it is advisable to read up on local laws before prospecting. Rock and mineral collecting is prohibited in most if not all national parks in the United States.

Resources
Since October 2000, mindat.org has been an important resource for mineral related fields. Its original purpose was to share information about minerals, their properties and where they are found. Today, it is the world's largest public database of mineral information supported worldwide by volunteers adding and verifying new information daily.

Related fields
Avid rock collectors often use their specimens to learn about gemstones, petrology, mineralogy and geology as well as skills in the identification and classifying of specimen rocks, and preparing them for display. The hobby can lead naturally into lapidary projects, and also the cutting, polishing, and mounting of gemstones and minerals. The equipment needed to do this includes rock saws and polishers. Many beautiful crystal varieties are typically found in very small samples which requires a good microscope for working with and photographing the specimen. The hobby can be as simple as finding pretty rocks for a windowsill or develop into a detailed and comprehensive museum quality display.

Notable Rockhounds and mineral collectors
Johann Wolfgang von Goethe (1748–1832) was a German author who was a skilled amateur scientist with a great interest in minerals. The iron mineral goethite is named after him. 

James Smithson (1765–1829) is well known as the benefactor of the Smithsonian Institution in Washington D.C. The Smithsonian now houses the finest collection of minerals and gems in the world. 

John Ruskin (1819–1900) was an Englishman, essayist and art critic who gained an interest early in his life for minerals. He authored a small volume of ten lectures on mineralogy titled "Ethics of the Dust". He gave numerous specimens to the British Natural History Museum including the well known Edwardes Ruby and yellow Colenso diamond. This octahedral diamond was a total of 133 carats and was on display at the museum for 70 years. In 1965 the diamond was stolen and to this day has never been recovered. 

George Frederick Kunz (1856–1932) assembled numerous important mineral collections throughout his life, such as a research collection for Thomas Edison. He also assembled the Morgan-Tiffany collection of gems which went to the American Museum of Natural History. He was mostly self-taught in regards to mineralogy and gemology, but his skills and knowledge landed him a position as a gem expert with Tiffany & Company at the age of 23. In 1903 the newly discovered violet pink variety of spodumene was named kunzite in his honor after his death.

John Sinkankas  (1915–2002) was a gemologist, lapidary enthusiast, micromounter and author. He was a fellow of the Mineralogical Society of America. In 1982, he was awarded the "Distinguished Associate Award" from the Gemological Institute of America.

See also

 Fossil collecting
 Geology
 Lapidary
 List of fossil sites
 Mineral collecting
 Rock

References

External links

 Collector's Corner, The Mineralogical Society of America
 Mindat Mineralogy Database
 The American Federation of Mineral Societies
 Southeast Federation of Mineralogical Societies
 Eastern Federation of Mineralogical and Lapidary Societies
 South Central Federation of Mineral Societies
 Midwest Federation Of Mineralogical and Geological Societies
 Rocky Mountain Federation of Mineralogical Societies
 California Federation of Mineralogical Societies
 Northwest Federation of Mineralogical Societies
 Gemological Institute of America

Collecting
Mineral exploration
Mineralogy